Roman Matoušek (1964–2020) was a speedway rider from the Czech Republic.

Speedway career 
Matoušek was the champion of the Czechoslovakia, winning the Czechoslovakian Individual Speedway Championship in 1988.

He rode in the top tier of British Speedway from 1986 until 1996, riding for various clubs.

World Final appearances

World Pairs Championship
 1986 -  Pocking, Rottalstadion (with Antonín Kasper Jr.) - 3rd - 32pts
 1987 -  Pardubice, Svítkov Stadion (with Antonín Kasper Jr.) - 5th - 30 pts
 1991 -  Poznań, Olimpia Poznań Stadium (with Zdeněk Tesař and Bohumil Brhel) - 5th 18pts (12)

Ice World Championship
1986 -  Stockholm - 18th - 2pts

References 

1964 births
2020 deaths
Czech speedway riders
Coventry Bees riders
Ipswich Witches riders
Sheffield Tigers riders
People from Slaný
Sportspeople from the Central Bohemian Region